Magnesium orthosilicate is a chemical compound with the formula Mg2SiO4. It is the orthosilicate salt of magnesium. It exists as Forsterite in nature.

Production

References

Magnesium compounds
Silicates